Franziska Fritz (born 3 January 1991 in Hildburghausen) is a German bobsledder.

Fritz competed at the 2014 Winter Olympics for Germany. She teamed with driver Sandra Kiriasis as the Germany-1 sled in the two-woman event, finishing 5th.

As of April 2014, her best showing at the World Championships is 7th, in 2013.

Fritz made her World Cup debut in December 2013. As of April 2014, she has one World Cup victory, coming at Winterberg in 2013-14.

World Cup Podiums

References

External links 
 
 
 

1991 births
Living people
German female bobsledders
Olympic bobsledders of Germany
People from Hildburghausen
Bobsledders at the 2014 Winter Olympics
Sportspeople from Thuringia
21st-century German women